Shahedshahr (also Romanized as Shāhedshahr; formerly, ‘Alīābād Drazeh) is a city in the Central District of Shahriar County, Tehran province, Iran. At the 2006 census, its population was 18,855 in 4,599 households. The following census in 2011 counted 20,865 people in 5,694 households. The latest census in 2016 showed a population of 25,544 people in 7,543 households.

References 

Shahriar County

Cities in Tehran Province

Populated places in Tehran Province

Populated places in Shahriar County